The Buraidah College of Technology was established in 1407H/1987 as the first college of technology in the Kingdom. 
Its first objectives and priorities to graduate the qualified technical cadres scientifically and practically to work in technical areas those contribute directly in building the national economy. 
During the first six years of implementation of the diploma program, the Technical and Vocational Training Corporation TVTC was in need for technical trainers to work in its technical institutes.
Therefore, the corporation adopted the idea of applying bachelor program to rehabilitate the distinguished graduates of the diploma program in technical colleges to work in the field of training in industrial secondary institutes and technical colleges.

See also 

 Technical and Vocational Training Corporation
 List of technical colleges in Saudi Arabia

References

http://www.tvtc.gov.sa

1987 establishments in Saudi Arabia
Educational institutions established in 1987
Universities and colleges in Saudi Arabia
Education in Buraidah
Technical universities and colleges in Saudi Arabia